Mitsubishi Fuso may refer to:

 Mitsubishi Fuso Truck and Bus Corporation (MFTBC)
 Mitsubishi Fuso Truck of America, Inc. (MFTA), a subsidiary of MFTBC